The 40-hour week movement, or eight-hour day movement, was a social movement to regulate the length of a working day.

40-hour week may also refer to:

Labor law and history
 Forty-Hour Week Convention, 1935, International Labour Organization Convention
 Labour law, including regulation of working time
 Working time, the period of time that a person spends at paid labor
 Workweek and weekend#Length

Music
 40-Hour Week, an album by Alabama
 "40 Hour Week (For a Livin')", the title song